Sidorovka is a rural locality (a village) in Verkhnegaleyevsky Selsoviet, Zilairsky District, Bashkortostan, Russia. The population was 226 as of 2010. There are 2 streets.

Geography 
Sidorovka is located 66 km east of Zilair (the district's administrative centre) by road. Petropavlovsky is the nearest rural locality.

References 

Rural localities in Zilairsky District